MXR is a New York-based manufacturer of effects pedals from Rochester. The manufacturer was co-founded in 1972 by Keith Barr and Terry Sherwood
 and incorporated as MXR Innovations, Inc. in 1974. The MXR trademark is now owned by Jim Dunlop, which continues to produce the original effects units along with new additions to the line.

History 
MXR co-founders Terry Sherwood and Keith Barr met as high school students at Rush-Henrietta Senior High School in Henrietta, NY a suburb of Rochester, New York. Together they started Audio Services, an audio repair business, where they repaired stereos and other music equipment in their rented basement apartment. This experience led them to form MXR and they began producing their first original effect pedal design: the Phase 90. This was quickly followed by the Distortion +, Dyna Comp, and the Blue Box. Michael Laiacona joined this early MXR team in a sales position. Barr later left MXR and went on to found Alesis while Sherwood and the top four managers/engineers of MXR , John Langlouise, Phil Betette, Tony Gambacurta and Richard Neutrour, co-founded Applied Research & Technology.  Mike Laiacona and his wife went on to found Whirlwind USA.

Jim Dunlop acquired the MXR brand in 1987 and continues the traditional pedal line of original MXR classics that have come to define the brand, such as the Phase 90 and Dyna Comp, as well as modern pedals like the Carbon Copy and Fullbore Metal. Dunlop has also added a line dedicated to bass effects boxes, MXR Bass Innovations, which has recently released the Bass Octave Deluxe and Bass Envelope Filter. Both pedals won Editor Awards in Bass Player Magazine and Platinum Awards from Guitar World Magazine. The MXR Custom Shop is responsible for recreations of vintage models such as the hand-wired Phase 45, as well as doing limited runs of pedals featuring premium components and highly modified designs such as the new Custom Comp.

Reference Series (1973–1984)

The first MXR effects pedal was the M-101 MXR Phase 90 phaser. The Phase 90 was used on the first two Van Halen albums.  The MXR Phase 45, a milder version of the Phase 90, followed, as well as a programmable version, the Phase 100. Like other pedals of the time, MXR pedals prior to 1981 did not have LEDs, A/C adaptor jacks, or true-bypass switching. Distinct periodic styles evolved over the years.

The first period is known as the "Script period," in reference to the cursive logo on the case. The earliest script logo pedals were made in the basement shop of the MXR founders and the logos were silk screened by hand. These very first pedals can be identified by a slightly larger font "MXR" on the case.

The "Box Logo Period 1" began around 1975-6 and lasted until 1981, and is named for the writing on the front of the box. The "Box logo period 2" started in early 1981 and went until 1984, when the company stopped making pedals. The main change in this era was the addition of LEDs and A/C adaptor jacks. These pedals used 1/8" power jacks and had exactly the same circuit board as their pre-1981 box logo brothers.

Commande Series (1981–1984)

In 1981, MXR introduced the Commande Series, a line of inexpensive plastic (Lexan polycarbonate) pedals. They were priced to compete with Japanese-manufactured effects pedals that were flooding the US and world markets.  Their design departed from the Reference Series in several respects.  The input, output and power jacks were all moved to the top of the case to allow a tighter grouping on the floor, or pedal board.  For the first time, MXR incorporated a large footswitch.

 M-161 MXR Phaser
 M-162 MXR Preamp
 M-163 MXR Sustain
 M-164 MXR Overdrive
 M-166 MXR Time Delay
 M-167 MXR Stereo Chorus
 M-168 MXR Stereo Flanger

2000 Series (1982–1984)

The Series 2000 was a complete rework of the Reference and Commande lines of pedals.  They were higher quality pedals, with electronic FET switching and dual LED indicators.  They had a contoured, all-metal chassis and an easily removable battery.  They had a fully rubberized bottom and were remote-controllable. Most of the pedals had dual outputs with distinctly different sounds.

The MXR Series 2000 sported six models. These original pedals in the series included the Dyna Comp, Distortion +, Phaser, Stereo Chorus, Stereo Flanger and Time Delay. In late 1983 MXR announced a digital sound effects pedal generator simply known as the Junior.  The Junior was released in early 1984 and was added to the other six pedals in the Series 2000 line. The Junior boasted four sound effects: a laser, a clap, a snare and a high hat. The effects were samples stored on a replaceable 24-pin ROM chip that was produced by MXR. MXR continued to manufacture most of the Reference, Commande and 2000 Series pedals until they closed their doors in 1984.

MXR rackmount effects

MXR also had a line of professional rackmount effects used by the likes of David Gilmour, Stuart Adamson and Mike Rutherford. The first product introduced was the Digital Delay, which had delay times from 0.08ms - 320ms, but users could purchase additional plug-in memory boards that were user-installable and could increase delay times to 1280ms.

Maximum Delay (msec)

In 1983, MXR introduced one of the first multi-effect rack units for guitar and bass, the Omni.  The Omni had 6 different effects: sustain, distortion, delay, equalization, flanger and chorus.  The main unit was a 2U with separate controls for each effect.  There was a footpedal (M-181) that enabled the player to switch the different effects on and off, as well as changing the order of the distortion and equalizer effects, a master bypass as well as an effects loop. Since 2006, the "M-181" product number has been re-appropriated by Jim Dunlop for the MXR Bass Blowtorch Overdrive pedal.

MXR Desktop Effects
In 1980 MXR released the MX-114 Two Channel Graphic Equalizer. From the 1980 Catalog: "The Equalizer's wide dynamic range and interface characteristics allow for a variety of applications. the frequency response of a system can be tailored to compensate for room acoustics, speaker aberrations and program material. Horizontal control placement and the equalizer's compact case permit easy manipulation in studio mix down situation. P.A. applications include: suppression of major feedback frequencies, compensation for high frequency attenuation in miking and rejection of unwanted signals (60Hz hum and noise) Two channels permit separate main and monitor equalization.

Drum Computers

In late 1981, MXR got the resale rights in the US to sell the KIT (M-178), a digital drum machine. In early 1983, MXR released the M-185  MXR Drum Computer, similar to Roger Linn's Linn LM-1 drum machine with individual pads for the instrument sounds and individual volume controls for each sound.

Jim Dunlop and MXR
Jim Dunlop  bought the MXR licensing rights and currently manufactures reissues of some of the classic MXR effects pedals. Dunlop has created new models in addition to the original lineup, including signature pedals such as Eddie Van Halen Phase 90 and Flanger, and Zakk Wylde's Wylde Overdrive and Black Label Chorus.

Products
MXR Dyna Comp
MXR Phase 90
MXR Distortion +

References

External links
Jim Dunlop

Music equipment manufacturers
Guitar effects manufacturing companies
Manufacturing companies based in Rochester, New York
Electronics companies established in 1972
1972 establishments in New York (state)